Danny is a 2020 Indian Tamil language action film written and directed by Santhanamoorthy on his directorial debut. The film casts Varalaxmi Sarathkumar in the main lead as a cop along with a Dog. Principal photography of the film began in January 2019. The film had an OTT release on ZEE5.

Cast 
 Varalaxmi Sarathkumar as Inspector Kunthavai
 Labrador Retriever as Danny
 Vela Ramamoorthy as Chidambaram 
 Anitha Sampath as Madhi
 Kawin as Neelakandan
 Durai Sudhakar as Selvam
 Vinoth Kishan as Kavi
 Aathreyaa as Saravanan
 KPY Ramar as Scientist
 Shanaaya Daphne as Dhanam
 Saravana Sakthi as Special appearance

Production 
The film was announced by first-time director LC Santhanamoorthy and the filming commenced during early January 2019. The film genre was revealed to be made as woman oriented action film casting Varalaxmi Sarathkumar as a police cop and making it the second consecutive time for the actress to play such a role after Maari 2. The first look poster was unveiled by actor Jayam Ravi on Varalaxmi's 34th birthday during 5 March 2019 and the filmmakers nicknamed the lead actress as Makkal Selvi on her birthday at the sets Danny.

Soundtrack

Release 
The film was released on ZEE5 on August 1, 2020.

References

External links 

 Danny at ZEE5

2020 directorial debut films
2020 films
Films about dogs
Indian action thriller films
Indian police films
ZEE5 original films
2020 action thriller films
2020s police procedural films
2020s Tamil-language films